Talyat Abdulganiyevich Sheikhametov (born 24 April 1966 in Shahrisabz) is a retired Soviet and later Ukrainian professional footballer. His first name often spells as Tolyat.

References

External links

1966 births
Living people
People from Shahrisabz
Soviet footballers
Ukrainian people of Crimean Tatar descent
Crimean Tatar sportspeople
Uzbekistani footballers
Uzbekistani emigrants to Ukraine
Ukrainian footballers
Ukrainian expatriate footballers
Association football forwards
FC Nasaf players
Pakhtakor Tashkent FK players
SC Tavriya Simferopol players
Maccabi Herzliya F.C. players
Hakoah Maccabi Amidar Ramat Gan F.C. players
FC Kremin Kremenchuk players
MFC Mykolaiv players
FC Elektrometalurh-NZF Nikopol players
Ukrainian Premier League players
Expatriate footballers in Israel
Ukrainian expatriate sportspeople in Israel
Ukrainian football managers